Iku-Shamagan (i-ku-Dsha-ma-gan) was a King of the second Mariote kingdom who reigned c. 2500 BCE. He is one of three Mari kings known from archaeology, Ikun-Shamash probably being the oldest one. Another king was Ishqi-Mari, also known from an inscribed statue. 

In their inscriptions, these Mari kings used the Akkadian language, whereas their contemporaries to the south used the Sumerian language.

Vase
A vase mentioning Iku-Shamagan "in an early semitic dialect" is also known:

Statue
Iku-Shamagan is known from a statue with inscription, discovered by André Parrot in 1952. The statue, in the National Museum of Damascus, was restored by the Louvre Museum in 2011.

Iku-Shamagan's votive statue was dedicated through an inscription on the back of the statue:

The statue was discovered in Mari, in the Temple Ninni-zaza.

The statue was heavily damaged during the conquest by the armies of the Empire of Akkad circa 2300 BCE.

Citations

Kings of Mari
25th-century BC rulers
25th-century BC people